Vigée is a surname. Notable people with the surname include:

Claude Vigée (born 1921), French poet
Étienne Vigée (1758–1820), French playwright
Louis Vigée (1715–1767), French painter
Louise Élisabeth Vigée Le Brun (1755–1842), French painter